German submarine U-184 was a Type IXC/40 U-boat of Nazi Germany's Kriegsmarine built for service during World War II.

She was ordered	on 15 August 1940 and was laid down on 10 June 1941 at DeSchiMAG AG Weser, Bremen, becoming yard number 1024. She was launched on 21 February 1942 and commissioned under her first and only commander Kapitänleutnant Günther Dangschat on 29 May. After a period of training with the 4th U-boat Flotilla, she joined the 2nd U-boat Flotilla for operational service on 1 November 1942.

Design
German Type IXC/40 submarines were slightly larger than the original Type IXCs. U-184 had a displacement of  when at the surface and  while submerged. She had two shafts and two  propellers.

U-184 was fitted with six  torpedo tubes (four fitted at the bow and two at the stern), 22 torpedoes, one  SK C/32 naval gun, 180 rounds, and a  SK C/30 as well as a  C/30 anti-aircraft gun. The boat had a complement of forty-eight.

Service history

On her first and only combat patrol she departed Bergen in Norway on 9 November 1942 and entered the north Atlantic via the gap between Iceland and the Faroe Islands. There were no survivors.

On 21 November she was listed as missing with all 50 hands east of Newfoundland, in approximate position .

U-184s loss remains an unsolved mystery. It is possible that she was sunk by a Canadian plane or warship as a result of the Battle of the St. Lawrence.

Previously recorded fate
U-184 was thought to have been sunk by depth charges from the Norwegian corvette , but in a post-war assessment this attack was later found to have been against , and had inflicted only minor damage.

Summary of raiding history

References

Bibliography

External links

German Type IX submarines
U-boats commissioned in 1942
U-boats sunk in 1942
World War II submarines of Germany
World War II shipwrecks in the Atlantic Ocean
Missing U-boats of World War II
1942 ships
Ships built in Bremen (state)
U-boats sunk by unknown causes
Maritime incidents in November 1942